76th NYFCC Awards
January 10, 2011

Best Picture: 
The Social Network

The 76th New York Film Critics Circle Awards, honoring the best in film for 2010, were announced on 12 December 2010 and presented on 10 January 2011.

Winners

Best Actor:
Colin Firth – The King's Speech
Best Actress:
Annette Bening – The Kids Are All Right
Best Animated Film:
The Illusionist (L'illusionniste)
Best Cinematography:
Matthew Libatique – Black Swan
Best Director:
David Fincher – The Social Network
Best Film:
The Social Network
Best First Film:
David Michôd – Animal Kingdom
Best Foreign Language Film:
Carlos • France
Best Non-Fiction Film:
Inside Job
Best Screenplay:
Lisa Cholodenko and Stuart Blumberg – The Kids Are All Right
Best Supporting Actor:
Mark Ruffalo – The Kids Are All Right
Best Supporting Actress:
Melissa Leo – The Fighter
Special Award:
Jeff Hill

References

External links
 2010 Awards

New York Film Critics Circle Awards
2010 film awards
2010 in American cinema
2010 awards in the United States
2010 in New York City